Rais Kola (also Romanized as Ra’īs Kolā) is a village in Babol Kenar Rural District, Babol Kenar District, Babol County, Mazandaran Province, Iran. At the 2006 census, its population was 678, in 167 families.

References 

Populated places in Babol County